Annie Wood (born February 10, 1971) is an American actress, host and writer, and is best known as the host of the nationally syndicated dating game show Bzzz!.

Career 

Wood was Cameron Diaz's sister-in-law in My Sister's Keeper and appeared in the role of sexy and quirky "Lara" in the Lionsgate Dane Cook/Jessica Alba movie Good Luck Chuck.  Her television credits include ER, Joey, NYPD Blue, Becker, Costello, Strong Medicine and Disney's That's So Raven!.

Wood appeared as guest on The Tonight Show with Jay Leno and Politically Incorrect with Bill Maher. She performed stand-up comedy at The Improv in Los Angeles following Jerry Seinfeld, and has authored several books including, Dandy Day, A Quantum Love Adventure and her first young adult novel, Just a Girl in the Whirl, which will be out in 2021.

Personal life 

Wood is married to writer/actor, Peter Arpesella.

Filmography

Film

Television

Video games

References

External links

1971 births
20th-century American actresses
21st-century American actresses
American film actresses
American game show hosts
American television actresses
American video game actresses
American voice actresses
Living people
Actresses from Los Angeles